Bridge House College, abbreviated to BHC, is one of Nigeria's pioneer independent co-education Sixth Form College located in Ikoyi, Lagos, Nigeria. It was established in the year 2004 to cater for pre-university preparation for high school leavers 15–19 years considering university Education in Nigeria and abroad.
The College is an accredited centre for Cambridge A level examinations and Cambridge face-to-face teacher training in Nigeria.

History
The College started off at 1, olagunsoye Oyinlola, 2nd Avenue, Ikoyi with 8 students interested in studying in the UK until 2007 when it introduced other destinations including US, Canada, UAE, Ireland, Ghana, Nigeria etc. The college moved to its permanent campus in 2014.
Since inception, Bridge House has educated more than 2,500 Nigerian students and kids of expatriates living in Nigeria.

Curriculum and pathways
Bridge House offers the following curriculum:
 Cambridge A Level (AS Level – 1 year)
 Cambridge A Level (A2 Level – 2 years)
 Cambridge A Level (Accelerated Level – 1 year)
 US Foundation Pathway + SAT (1 year)
 University Foundation Programme 
 Medical Foundation Programme

Ranking and results

Bridge House College has been ranked among Top schools for the Cambridge A Level Programme in Nigeria as published by Edusko, Infoguidenigeria and LegitNG.
In 2019, over 70% of enrolled students achieved A*-B grades in the May/June 2019 Cambridge A level results.  
With the Cambridge A level programme, students can get admitted into Second year in all universities in Nigeria.

Outstanding Cambridge Learners Award Nigeria 

At the inaugural British Council Recognition and outstanding Cambridge Learners Awards, Nigeria which held in Lagos in 2017, four Bridge House students came out Top in Nigeria in 4 subjects; physics (International AS Level), business (International A Level), Economics (International A Level) and physics (International A Level).
The Outstanding Cambridge Learner Awards is an annual event organised by the British Council which celebrates the outstanding performance and success of students taking the Cambridge International Examinations in over 40 countries around the world.

Scholarship Opportunities

In 2018, the college awarded a two-year fully covered scholarship worth N9 million to the best performing student in Nigeria in the May/June 2018 West African Senior School Certificate Examination (WASSCE), conducted by West African Examination Council (WAEC). The beneficiary, David Okorogheye, had obtained parallel A1 grade in all his subjects and also scored 332 in his Joint Admission and Matriculation Board (JAMB) examination.

The University of Birmingham recently announced that Bridge House students will be benefiting from a new scholarship category exclusive to Nigerian students applying for an undergraduate programmes at University of Birmingham starting in September 2020. The scholarship is worth  £2,500 to be awarded to the highest performing Bridge House student for the 2019/2020 session.

BHC Alumni
Bridge House College established The BHC Alumni as a way of developing a relationship between current and former students of the college. Ex-students contribute to mentoring of the students in the college.

An alumna of the college, Serena Omolamai got admitted into more than 8 US Universities in 2016 and obtained the 1870 scholarship at Syracuse University, New York worth $53,000 – the highest recognition offered by the Office of Admissions. She was named Class of 2020 Senior Marshal during Syracuse University's 166th Commencement ceremony.

In 2018, an alumnus of the College, Benjamin Inemugha broke a Guinness World Record.

Benjamin had graduated from the Bridge House College One-Year University Foundation Programme in 2015 before proceeding to University of Birmingham to study Electrical and Electronics Engineering.

Annual Universities Fair
Every year, Bridge House College organizes an annual universities fair where representatives from over 30 universities from the UK, US and Canada meet with parents and students of the college to discuss students' transition. Attendees include representatives from University of Leeds, University of Birmingham, Leicester University, University of Essex, Brock University, Louisiana State University etc.

Annual Lecture and Graduation Ceremony 
The Bridge House Annual Graduation hosts highly notable speakers and education enthusiasts in Nigeria yearly. Past Speakers include the Chairman of First Bank plc, Mrs Ibukun Awosika, Founder, Zinox Technologies, Leo Stan Ekeh, Founder/CEO of Rise Network, Toyosi Akerele-Ogunsiji, CEO, Alpha Reach, Japhet Omojuwa, wife of former governor of Lagos State, Dame Abimbola Fashola, former Deputy Governor, Lagos State, Sarah Adebisi Sosan, the British Deputy High Commissioner, Ray Kyles and so on.

In 2018, Alh. Abdul Samad Rabiu, an ex-parent of the school chaired the occasion and donated N50 Million to Bridge House college under the BUA Foundation.

Affiliations

Bridge House College is affiliated to over 50 universities in various countries including UK, US, Canada, UAE, Ireland, South Africa, Ghana, Nigeria etc. The college is a member of the Council of British International Schools (COBIS), Association of International School Educators of Nigeria (AISEN), Associations of Private Educators in Nigeria (APEN) and have working relationship with the British Council Nigeria, Institute of Education Dublin, Ireland. Bridge House College's University Foundation Programme is accredited by Brooke House College, UK

College Administrator

Principals

References

External links
 Official website

Schools in Lagos
Education International
University-preparatory schools
2004 establishments in Nigeria
Educational institutions established in 2004